Androstenolone may refer to:

 Testosterone (androst-4-en-17β-ol-3-one), an endogenous androgen/anabolic steroid and an intermediate in the biosynthesis of estradiol
 Epitestosterone (androst-4-en-17α-ol-3-one), an inactive endogenous steroid
 Dehydroepiandrosterone (DHEA, 5-DHEA) (androst-4-en-3β-ol-17-one), an endogenous weak androgen, an estrogen, a neurosteroid, and an intermediate in the biosynthesis of testosterone
 1-Testosterone (androst-4-en-17β-ol-3-one), a synthetic androgen/anabolic steroid
 4-Dehydroepiandrosterone (4-DHEA) (androst-4-en-3β-ol-17-one), an androgen prohormone
 1-Androsterone (1-DHEA) (5α-androst-1-en-3β-ol-17-one), a synthetic androgen prohormone

See also
 Androstanolone
 Androstenediol
 Androstanedione
 Androstanediol
 Androstenedione

Androstanes